The 2021–22 NBL season was the 44th season for the Illawarra Hawks in the NBL.

Roster

Pre-season

Ladder

Game log 

|-style="background:#cfc;"
| 1
| 15 November
| @ South East Melbourne
| W 112–116 (OT)
| Justinian Jessup (27)
| Cleveland, Coenraad, H. Froling, S. Froling, Jessup (5)
| Xavier Rathan-Mayes (7)
| Melbourne Sports and Aquatic Centreclosed event
| 1–0
|-style="background:#cfc;"
| 2
| 20 November
| @ Melbourne
| W 90–97
| Antonius Cleveland (21)
| Duop Reath (6)
| Harvey, Rathan-Mayes (3)
| Melbourne Sports and Aquatic Centreclosed event
| 2–0

|-style="background:#ccc;"
| 1
| 25 November
| New Zealand
| colspan="6" | Cancelled
|-style="background:#ccc;"
| 2
| 27 November
| Sydney
| colspan="6" | Cancelled

Regular season

Ladder

Game log 

|-style="background:#cfc;"
| 1
| 5 December
| @ Adelaide
| W 71–81
| Duop Reath (18)
| Duop Reath (9)
| Tyler Harvey (6)
| Adelaide Entertainment Centre4,802
| 1–0
|-style="background:#cfc;"
| 2
| 11 December
| @ Sydney
| W 84–92
| Duop Reath (27)
| Sam Froling (13)
| Jessup, Rathan-Mayes (4)
| Qudos Bank Arena6,212
| 2–0
|-style="background:#cfc;"
| 3
| 17 December
| New Zealand
| W 97–96 (2OT)
| Tyler Harvey (26)
| Duop Reath (13)
| Justinian Jessup (4)
| WIN Entertainment Centre2,873
| 3–0
|-style="background:#fcc;"
| 4
| 19 December
| @ Brisbane
| L 96–92
| H.Froling, Reath (15)
| Sam Froling (11)
| H.Froling, Jessup (4)
| Nissan Arena3,584
| 3–1

|-style="background:#cfc;"
| 5
| 13 January
| Sydney
| W 97–89
| Sam Froling (27)
| Sam Froling (10)
| Tyler Harvey (5)
| WIN Entertainment Centre1,994
| 4–1
|-style="background:#fcc;"
| 6
| 16 January
| Melbourne
| L 84–88
| Justinian Jessup (18)
| Sam Froling (13)
| Xavier Rathan-Mayes (5)
| WIN Entertainment Centre1,753
| 4–2
|-style="background:#fcc;"
| 7
| 22 January
| Perth
| L 78–94
| Jessup, Rathan-Mayes (17)
| Cleveland, S.Froling, Rathan-Mayes (8)
| Harvey, Rathan-Mayes (4)
| WIN Entertainment Centre2,278
| 4–3
|-style="background:#cfc;"
| 8
| 24 January
| Adelaide
| W 100–89
| Harry Froling (27)
| Harry Froling (9)
| Xavier Rathan-Mayes (7)
| WIN Entertainment Centre2,141
| 5–3
|-style="background:#fcc;"
| 9
| 27 January
| Perth
| L 80–94
| Antonius Cleveland (22)
| Cleveland, Reath (7)
| S.Froling, Harvey, Rathan-Mayes (3)
| WIN Entertainment Centre2,240
| 5–4
|-style="background:#cfc;"
| 10
| 29 January
| @ Cairns
| W 75–94
| Tyler Harvey (24)
| Sam Froling (13)
| Harvey, Jessup (3)
| Cairns Convention Centre3,095
| 6–4

|-style="background:#fcc;"
| 11
| 2 February
| @ New Zealand
| L 90–67
| Tyler Harvey (17)
| Cleveland, S.Froling (7)
| Tyler Harvey (3)
| MyState Bank Arenaclosed event
| 6–5
|-style="background:#fcc;"
| 12
| 7 February
| S.E. Melbourne
| L 87–88
| Tyler Harvey (20)
| Rathan-Mayes, Reath (8)
| Xavier Rathan-Mayes (5)
| WIN Entertainment Centre2,040
| 6–6
|-style="background:#cfc;"
| 13
| 12 February
| Cairns
| W 87–81
| Jessup, Reath (18)
| Duop Reath (10)
| Xavier Rathan-Mayes (5)
| WIN Entertainment Centre2,652
| 7–6
|-style="background:#cfc;"
| 14
| 18 February
| Cairns
| W 79–54
| Duop Reath (16)
| Sam Froling (10)
| Xavier Rathan-Mayes (4)
| WIN Entertainment Centre2,275
| 8–6
|-style="background:#fcc;"
| 15
| 20 February
| Tasmania
| L 86–96
| Duop Reath (25)
| Xavier Rathan-Mayes (10)
| Xavier Rathan-Mayes (9)
| WIN Entertainment Centre2,325
| 8–7
|-style="background:#cfc;"
| 16
| 25 February
| Adelaide
| W 87–71
| Duop Reath (18)
| Sam Froling (9)
| Antonius Cleveland (6)
| WIN Entertainment Centre3,002
| 9–7

|-style="background:#cfc;"
| 17
| 1 March
| @ New Zealand
| W 87–102
| Justinian Jessup (23)
| Coenraad, S.Froling (8)
| Xavier Rathan-Mayes (7)
| MyState Bank Arenaclosed event
| 10–7
|-style="background:#cfc;"
| 18
| 6 March
| @ S.E. Melbourne
| W 77–83
| Xavier Rathan-Mayes (19)
| Cleveland, Jessup (7)
| Cleveland, H.Froling, Harvey, Rathan-Mayes (3)
| John Cain Arena2,989
| 11–7
|-style="background:#fcc;"
| 19
| 13 March
| @ Tasmania
| L 81–77
| Tyler Harvey (16)
| Duop Reath (7)
| Sam Froling (4)
| MyState Bank Arena4,738
| 11–8
|-style="background:#cfc;"
| 20
| 17 March
| S.E. Melbourne
| W 103–97
| Harvey, Reath (22)
| Duop Reath (12)
| Antonius Cleveland (4)
| WIN Entertainment Centre2,324
| 12–8
|-style="background:#cfc;"
| 21
| 19 March
| @ Tasmania
| W 65–91
| Antonius Cleveland (22)
| Duop Reath (11)
| Xavier Rathan-Mayes (5)
| Silverdome3,532
| 13–8
|-style="background:#cfc;"
| 22
| 27 March
| @ Melbourne
| W 77–92
| Antonius Cleveland (20)
| Antonius Cleveland (8)
| Xavier Rathan-Mayes (7)
| John Cain Arena5,017
| 14–8
|-style="background:#cfc;"
| 23
| 31 March
| Brisbane
| W 87–70
| Justinian Jessup (29)
| Antonius Cleveland (9)
| Antonius Cleveland (6)
| WIN Entertainment Centre2,262
| 15–8

|-style="background:#cfc;"
| 24
| 2 April
| @ Melbourne
| W 90–96
| Xavier Rathan-Mayes (25)
| Jessup, Reath (9)
| Xavier Rathan-Mayes (8)
| John Cain Arena4,517
| 16–8
|-style="background:#cfc;"
| 25
| 9 April
| @ Brisbane
| W 77–108
| Duop Reath (28)
| Duop Reath (11)
| Cleveland, Harvey (6)
| Nissan Arena3,652
| 17–8
|-style="background:#fcc;"
| 26
| 14 April
| Sydney
| L 102–107 (OT)
| Tyler Harvey (35)
| Sam Froling (13)
| Tyler Harvey (5)
| WIN Entertainment Centre4,872
| 17–9
|-style="background:#cfc;"
| 27
| 22 April
| @ Perth
| W 77–82
| Tyler Harvey (22)
| Cleveland, S.Froling (11)
| Xavier Rathan-Mayes (4)
| RAC Arena10,251
| 18–9
|-style="background:#cfc;"
| 28
| 24 April
| @ Sydney
| W 84–87
| Justinian Jessup (24)
| Cleveland, Reath (6)
| Xavier Rathan-Mayes (4)
| Qudos Bank Arena12,632
| 19–9

Postseason 

|-style="background:#fcc;"
| 1
| 29 April
| Sydney
| L 79–89
| Duop Reath (26)
| Duop Reath (11)
| Xavier Rathan-Mayes (4)
| WIN Entertainment Centre5,621
| 1–0
|-style="background:#fcc;"
| 2
| 1 May
| @ Sydney
| L 99–87
| Tyler Harvey (21)
| Antonius Cleveland (12)
| Harvey, Jessup (3)
| Qudos Bank Arena9,824
| 0–2

Transactions

Re-signed

Additions

Subtractions

Awards

Club awards 
 Community Award: Daniel Grida
 Defensive Player: Antonius Cleveland
 Members Award: Antonius Cleveland
 Player's Player Award: Antonius Cleveland
 Club MVP: Duop Reath
 Club Person of the Year: Joe Tertzakian (Team manager)

See also 
 2021–22 NBL season
 Illawarra Hawks

References

External links 

 Official Website

Illawarra Hawks
Illawarra Hawks seasons
Illawarra Hawks season